Sandra Gantenbein (born c. 1984 in Bern) is a Swiss curler.

At the national level, she is a 2013 Swiss women's champion curler.

Teams

References

External links

Living people
1984 births
Sportspeople from Bern
Swiss female curlers
Swiss curling champions
Date of birth missing (living people)